Jalayer may refer to:
 Jalayer, Ardabil, a village in Iran
 Jalayer, East Azerbaijan, a village in Iran
 Jalayer, Shazand, a village in Markazi Province, Iran
 Jalayer, Tafresh, a village in Markazi Province, Iran
Jalayer (surname)